ARML may refer to:
 Augmented Reality Markup Language, a standard to describe Augmented Reality scenes and environments
 American Regions Mathematics League, an annual high school mathematics team competition